Albert Eustace Haydon (1880–1975) was a Canadian historian of religion and a leader of the humanist movement.

Biography

Haydon was ordained to Baptist ministry and served a church in Dresden, Ontario, in 1903–04. He ministered to the First Unitarian Society of Madison, Wisconsin, from 1918 to 1923.  He was head of the Department of Comparative Religion at the University of Chicago from 1919 to 1945. While there, he was an influential voice of naturalist humanism. In 1933 he was one of signers of the Humanist Manifesto.  The American Humanist Association awarded him the Humanist of the Year award in 1956.

Haydon's Biography of the Gods is an account of the origin of human belief in Gods and the rise and decline of Gods throughout history. Chapters are dedicated to the belief in Ahura Mazda, the Gods of China, India, Japan and the God in Abrahamic religions. Haydon concludes that just as belief in most of the old Gods is dead, the Christian God is no exception and is on the road to extinction. According to Haydon, Gods are invented so long as they meet real human needs (emotional and economic) and fulfill desires, fantasies and longings. When man's beliefs and fancies change the Gods die and substitutions take their place. Personal Gods outnumber abstract deities because the latter do not serve man's emotional nature or demands of practical living.

Selected publications

The Quest of the Ages (1929)
Man's Search for the Good Life (1937)
Biography of the Gods (1941, 1967)
Modern Trends in World Religions (1968)

References

External links 
 Dictionary of Unitarian & Universalist Biography - Eustace Haydon

1880 births
1975 deaths
20th-century Canadian Baptist ministers
Canadian historians of religion
Canadian humanists
Canadian skeptics
Canadian Unitarian Universalists
Former Baptists
People from Chatham-Kent
Scholars of comparative religion
Secular humanists